Parthenina affectuosa is a species of sea snail, a marine gastropod mollusk in the family Pyramidellidae, the pyrams and their allies.

Habitat
This species is found in the following habitats:
 Brackish
 Marine

References

 Okutani T., ed. (2000) Marine mollusks in Japan. Tokai University Press. 1173 pp. page(s): 725

External links
 To World Register of Marine Species

Pyramidellidae
Gastropods described in 1927